The Little Ivies are an unofficial group of small, academically competitive private liberal arts colleges in the Northeastern United States. The term Little Ivy derives from these schools' small student bodies, standards of academic excellence, associated historic social prestige, and highly selective admissions comparable to the Ivy League. According to Bloomberg, the Little Ivies are also known for their large financial endowments, both absolutely and relative to their size. 

The term is generally and most associated with the colleges of the New England Small College Athletic Conference (NESCAC), with select schools from the Liberty League, Patriot League and the Centennial Conference.  The term, however, was in active circulation to depict the original "Little Ivy" schools as schools and not merely athletic rivals at least as early as 1955. The New York Times quotes the President of Swarthmore College saying at the time, "We not only have the Ivy League, and the pretty clearly understood though seldom mentioned gradations within the Ivy League, but we have the Little Ivy League, and the jockeying for position within that."

Relationship to NESCAC
Among the Little Ivies are the "Little Three", a term used by Amherst College, Wesleyan University and Williams College, and "Maine Big Three", a term used by Colby College, Bates College and Bowdoin College. The term is inspired by the "Big Three" Ivy League athletic rivalry between Harvard, Princeton, and Yale.

Amherst College, Wesleyan University and Williams College joined Bowdoin College to found the New England Small College Athletic Conference (NESCAC) in 1971 along with Bates College, Colby College, Hamilton College, Middlebury College, Tufts University, and Trinity College. Connecticut College joined in 1977.

List of little ivies
A 2016 article by Bloomberg Businessweek lists the members of the Little Ivies as:
Amherst College
Bates College
Bowdoin College
Bucknell University
Colgate University
Connecticut College
Colby College
Hamilton College
Haverford College
Lafayette College
Middlebury College
Swarthmore College
Trinity College
Tufts University
Union College
Vassar College
Wesleyan University
Williams College

The Little Ivies are also sub-grouped by the following consortia: 
 The New England Small College Athletic Conference (NESCAC) members: Amherst, Bates, Bowdoin, Colby, Connecticut College, Hamilton, Middlebury, Trinity, Tufts, Wesleyan and Williams. 
 The colleges of the "Little Three": Amherst, Wesleyan, and Williams. This athletic league was founded as the "Triangular League" in 1899 in New England. The term is inspired by the term "Big Three" of the Ivy League: Harvard, Princeton, and Yale despite there being no academic, athletic or historical association.
 The colleges of the Colby-Bates-Bowdoin Consortium (CBB), an athletic conference among three academically selective colleges colloquially known as the "Maine Big Three": Bates College, Bowdoin College, and Colby College.

See also

 Black Ivy League — informal list of colleges that attracted top African American students prior to the Civil Rights Movement in the 1960s
 Claremont Colleges — group of highly selective liberal arts colleges in Southern California
 Hidden Ivies
 Jesuit Ivy — Use of "Ivy" to characterize Boston College and other prominent American Jesuit colleges
 Public Ivies — Group of public U.S. universities that "provide an Ivy League collegiate experience at a public school price"
 Quaker Consortium — a  Philadelphia-based arrangement between Bryn Mawr College, Haverford College, Swarthmore College, and the University of Pennsylvania
 Southern Ivies — Use of "Ivy" to characterize excellent universities in the U. S. South
 Seven Sisters (colleges) — historically women's colleges founded as an answer to the (at the time) all male Ivy League: Wellesley College, Radcliffe College, Smith College, Mount Holyoke College, Barnard College, Vassar College, and Bryn Mawr College
 Maple League — The Maple League is made up of four Canadian universities – Acadia, Bishop’s, Mount Allison and St. Francis Xavier – who together form an alliance of small, rural, academically-oriented, liberal arts institutions with Francophone heritage and a commitment to honouring indigenous communities.

References

Lists of universities and colleges in the United States
New England Small College Athletic Conference
Colloquial terms for groups of universities and colleges
.